Aliyah is a 2018 Indian Meitei language film directed by Yoimayai Mongsaba, written by Binoranjan Oinam and produced by Reshi Thokchom. The film features Artina Thoudam in the titular role and Gurumayum Bonny in the lead roles. The film was released on 19 August 2018 at MSFDS (Manipur State Film Development Society), Palace Compound, Imphal.

Synopsis
It is a romantic film about a Hindu guy Leishabi and a Muslim lady Aliyah, where religion happens to be the main reason for their relationship to fall apart.

Cast
 Artina Thoudam as Aliyah
 Gurumayum Bonny as Leishabi
 Idhou as Hanif's Father
 Surjit Saikhom as Hanif
 Tayenjam Mema as Leishabi's Mother
 Sagolsem Dhanamanjuri as Aliyah's Mother
 Billa Ngathem as Nafisa, Aliyah's friend
 Sanatomba as Aliyah's Uncle-in-law
 Ningthouja Jayvidya as Moneylender
 Longjam Ongbi Lalitabi

Accolades
Aliyah won Best Actor in a Leading Role - Female and Best Story awards at the 8th Sahitya Seva Samiti Awards (SSS MANIFA) 2019, with several nominations in different categories. It won the Best Editor Award at the 12th Manipur State Film Awards 2019.

Soundtrack
Tony Aheibam and Jeetenkumar Naorem composed the soundtrack for the film and Binoranjan Oinam wrote the lyrics. The songs are titled Marou Leibi and Leihoure. The song Marou Leibi was initially composed by Tony Aheibam, but was re-composed by Jeetenkumar Naorem due to the ban by Film Forum Manipur with the claim that the tune is similar to classical song tunes of other language.

See also 
 List of Meitei-language films

References

External links
 

2018 films
2010s Meitei-language films
Indian interfaith romance films
Meitei Pangals